"I Am that I Am" is a common English translation of the Hebrew phrase – also "I am who (I) am", "I will become what I choose to become", "I am what I am", "I will be what I will be", "I create what(ever) I create", or "I am the Existing One". The traditional English translation within Judaism favours "I will be what I will be" because the imperfective aspect in Modern Hebrew is normally used for future tense and there is no present tense with direct object of the verb "to be" in the Hebrew language.

Etymology

 is the first of three responses given to Moses when he asks for God's name in the Book of Exodus. The meaning of the longer phrase  is debated, and might be seen as a promise ('I will be with you') or as statement of incomparability ('I am without equal').

Biblical Hebrew did not distinguish between grammatical tenses, it instead had an aspectual system in which the perfect denoted any actions that have been completed, and imperfect denoted any actions that are not yet completed. It therefore may be translated as 'I am', but also as a modal form such as 'I may be', 'I would be', 'I could be', etc. Accordingly, the whole phrase can be rendered in English not only as 'I am that I am' but also as 'I will be what I will be' or 'I will be who I will be', or 'I shall prove to be whatsoever I shall prove to be' or even 'I will be because I will be'.

The word  is a relative pronoun whose meaning depends on the immediate context, so that 'that', 'who', 'which', or 'where' are all possible translations of that word.

An application of this phrase used in the New Testament has "But by the grace of God I am what I am ..." (1 Corinthians 15:10).

Interpretation 
According to the Hebrew Bible, in the encounter of the burning bush Moses asks what he is to say to the Israelites when they ask what gods ('Elohiym) have sent him to them, and Yahweh replies, "I am who I am", adding, "Say this to the people of Israel, 'I am has sent me to you. It is somewhat remarkable that despite this exchange, the Israelites never ask Moses for the name of God. Then there are a number of probably unanswerable questions, including who it is that does not know God's name, Moses or the Israelites (most commentators take it that it is Moses who does not know, meaning that the Israelites will ask him the name in order to prove his credentials), and just what the statement means.

The last can be approached in three ways:
 "I am who I am" – an evasion of Moses' question;
 "I am who am" or "I am he who is" – a statement of the nature of Israel's God;
 I Am' is who I am", or "I am because I am" – this version has not played a major part in scholarly discussion of the phrase, but the first variant has been incorporated into the New English Bible.

Other views
In the Hindu Advaita Vedanta, the South Indian sage Ramana Maharshi mentions that of all the definitions of God, "none is indeed so well put as the biblical statement 'I am that I am. He maintained that although Hindu scripture contains similar statements, the Mahavakyas, these are not as direct as given in Exodus. Further the "I am" is explained by Sri Nisargadatta Maharaj as an abstraction in the mind of the Stateless State, of the Absolute, or the Supreme Reality, called Parabrahman: it is pure awareness, prior to thoughts, free from perceptions, associations, memories. Parabrahman is often considered to be a cognate term for the Supreme Being in Hinduism.

Victor P. Hamilton suggests "some legitimate translations ...: (1) 'I am who I am'; (2) 'I am who I was'; (3) 'I am who I shall be'; (4) 'I was who I am'; (5) 'I was who I was'; (6) 'I was who I shall be'; (7) 'I shall be who I am'; (8) 'I shall be who I was'; (9) 'I shall be who I shall be'."

The Bahá'í Faith reference to "I Am" can be found in on page 316 of The Dawn-Breakers:

See also
 Aham Brahmasmi
 Be, and it is
 Ego eimi
 El
 Elohim
 I am (biblical term)
  e.g. "I and I"
 It Is What It Is
 I Yam What I Yam
 Jehovah
 Names of God
 Names of God in Islam
 Om
 Self-reference
 Soham
 Tat Tvam Asi
 Tetragrammaton
 Unmoved mover
 You Are What You Is
 Quine (computing)

References

Bibliography

External links 

Book of Exodus
Christian mysticism
Hebrew Bible words and phrases
Jewish mysticism
Names of God in Christianity
Names of God in Judaism